Kenneth Paul Huckaby (born January 27, 1971) is an American former professional baseball catcher, and minor league coach. Huckaby attended Manteca High School, and played in Major League Baseball (MLB) for the Arizona Diamondbacks, Toronto Blue Jays, Texas Rangers, Baltimore Orioles, and Boston Red Sox over his 6-year career.

Playing career

2002–2005 
A competent defensive replacement with a strong throwing arm, his most productive season came in 2002 with Toronto, when he posted career-highs in batting average (.245), home runs (3), RBI (22) and games (88).

Huckaby became the first catcher in Blue Jays history to hit an inside-the-park home run on July 17, 2002 .

Huckaby was involved in a collision with shortstop Derek Jeter in the 2003 season opener against the New York Yankees. With Jeter on first base and Jason Giambi at bat, Toronto used an extreme shift that left third base uncovered. Giambi hit a soft grounder to the pitcher, Roy Halladay, who threw to first baseman Carlos Delgado for an out. Jeter, seeing Toronto out of position, rounded second and ran to third. Huckaby ran up the line to cover third and fielded Delgado's throw. Jeter dove headfirst into the bag, while Huckaby attempted to catch the baseball and block Jeter from reaching third. In doing so, Huckaby fell onto Jeter; his shin guard driving into Jeter's shoulder.

2006 
In the 2006 spring training, Huckaby had an opportunity of being the backup catcher for the Red Sox. Then, he injured his left knee during the first exhibition game and lost the job to Josh Bard, who was later sent to San Diego for Doug Mirabelli. On August 1, Huckaby was added to the 25-man roster to serve as Mirabelli's backup while Boston's regular catcher Jason Varitek recuperated from an ailing left knee. Before the call, he appeared in 68 games for Triple-A Pawtucket, hitting .207 with two home runs and 16 RBI.  Huckaby's backup role was once again brought into question with Boston's acquisition of Javy López on August 3. That night, Huckaby went 1 for 3 with an RBI. However, the very next day, August 4, Huckaby was designated for assignment. He later cleared waivers and returned to Pawtucket.

2007 
Prior to the 2007 season, Huckaby was invited to attend spring training with the Los Angeles Dodgers and was assigned to Triple-A at the end of spring, where he spent the entire season playing for the Las Vegas 51s.

2008 
In January , Huckaby signed a minor league contract with the Kansas City Royals. Huckaby was released by the Royals on May 10, 2008.

Coaching career 
After spending the  season as the hitting coach with the Bluefield Blue Jays, Toronto's Rookie League Affiliate, Huckaby served as the hitting coach in 2014 for Class-A Lansing Lugnuts. In 2015, he got his first managing job taking over from John Tamargo Jr. as the Lugnuts manager. After taking the Lugnuts to the Eastern Division Championship Series he moved up to Class A-Advanced to manage the Dunedin Blue Jays for the 2016 season.

In 2017 he was elevated to the role of Catching Coordinator for all of Toronto's minor league affiliates.

On November 13, 2019, Huckaby was named manager of the Triple-A Buffalo Bisons for the 2020 season, replacing Bobby Meacham. Terminated by the Blue Jays September 24, 2020 without having managed a single game in Buffalo (Minor league season cancelled and worked with players at the Rochester facility)

References

External links

1971 births
Living people
Albuquerque Dukes players
American expatriate baseball players in Canada
Arizona Diamondbacks players
Bakersfield Dodgers players
Baltimore Orioles players
Baseball coaches from California
Baseball players from California
Boston Red Sox players
Buffalo Bisons (minor league) managers
Columbus Clippers players
Delta College Mustangs baseball players
El Paso Diablos players
Great Falls Dodgers players
Las Vegas 51s players
Leones del Caracas players
American expatriate baseball players in Venezuela
Major League Baseball catchers
Oklahoma RedHawks players
Omaha Royals players
Pawtucket Red Sox players
People from San Leandro, California
San Antonio Missions players
San Joaquin Delta College alumni
Syracuse SkyChiefs players
Tacoma Rainiers players
Texas Rangers players
Toronto Blue Jays players
Tucson Sidewinders players
Vero Beach Dodgers players